Anzan may refer to:

 Anshan (Persia)
 a part of masjedsoleyman and izeh, some city's in Iran
 Anzan, Ardabil, a village in Iran
 Anzan, Golestan, old name of an area in west part of Golestan province in North of Iran
 Mental abacus; 暗算, Japanese mental calculation way by imagination of soroban (算盤)
 A type of Japanese amulet, called omamori, used by pregnant women
 Ançã (Cantanhede), a Portuguese civil parish